Avoca Handweavers, now mostly known simply as Avoca, is a clothing manufacturing, retail and food business in Ireland. The company began in Avoca, County Wicklow, and is the oldest working woollen mill in Ireland and one of the world's oldest manufacturing companies. Since 2015, it has been owned by the American food service and facilities company, Aramark.

History
The mill on the banks of the fast-flowing River Avoca survives from at least 1723.  Travel to and from the remote village was difficult and a barter system was used.  The mill was used for grinding corn for bread and spinning and weaving wool.

In 1760, a flying shuttle loom, capable of weaving up to 20 metres of cloth a day arrived.  Workers, concerned about possible unemployment, resorted to burning some looms.

Wynne sisters

Three sisters, Emily, Winifred, and Veronica Wynne, inherited the mill in the 1920s and introduced colour. Avoca Handweavers tweed was produced and exported, including for use by Italian designer Elsa Schiaparelli. The material was also used for a waistcoat for King George VI and baby blankets for the children of Queen Elizabeth II.

Pratt family
In 1974, Donald Pratt, a solicitor and former cricketer engaged to handle the sale of the mill which now faced closure, decided to buy it himself. Along with his wife, Hilary, a teacher, he set about getting Avoca Handweavers back on its feet. The Pratts began exporting handwoven rugs and throws to the UK and other countries. Avoca throws are still sold across the globe.

In 2015, the Pratt family sold Avoca Handweavers to the American company Aramark.

Aramark

As of 2020, Avoca has several retail outlets around Ireland, including at Powerscourt Estate, Malahide Castle and in Belfast. Several of these also have foodhalls and cafes attached as their food operations were expanded.

The company has a number of women's clothing ranges which it sells through its own stores designed by Amanda Pratt, as well as wholesaling in Ireland and internationally. One of these ranges is known as 'Avoca Anthology'.

Avoca is also associated with gardens and has several rare trees in its Kilmacanogue grounds and a garden at Mount Usher Gardens in Ashford, County Wicklow.

As of 2020, the company reportedly employed approximately 1,000 people.

References

Retail companies of Ireland
County Wicklow
Companies of the Republic of Ireland
Tourist attractions in County Wicklow